The London Boat Show was an event held in London from 1955 to 2018, organised by British Marine. First held at Olympia, it was later moved to the Earls Court Exhibition Centre, and finally the ExCeL Exhibition Centre. The show's cancellation was announced in May 2018, with organisers citing the show as commercially unviable for the industry in its current format.

History
The first London Boat Show was held at Olympia, before moving to the Earls Court Exhibition Centre in 1957. A popular feature of the show during its time at Earls Court was the use of the venue's pool area to host floating boats for visitors' inspection. It had expanded for some years into Chelsea Harbour before being moved to ExCeL in 2004. The inclusion of smaller craft such as dinghies, kayaks, canoes and stand-up paddleboards, as well as popular watersports such as wakeboarding, led to the inclusion of the Watersports Action Pool, where visitors could watch the craft indoors.

The show was usually ten days long, but in 2018 was reduced to five days.

Sponsorship
In November 2014 it was announced that CWM FX had become the title sponsor for the London Boat Show. Since 2015 the show would be known as the CWM FX London Boat Show. CWM FX was closed in March 2015 after allegedly operating a Ponzi scheme.

Attendances in final years

See also
 UK Waterways

References

External links
Website of the British Marine Federation

Boat Show
Boat shows in the United Kingdom